Live PD Presents: Women on Patrol is an American reality television series and spin-off of Live PD. The series premiered on Lifetime on June 18, 2018 and follows female law enforcement officers across the United States. It was ordered to series on April 25, 2018 and initially received a twenty-episode order. The episode order was later increased to forty, however, only thirty-four episodes aired.

Production
On April 25, 2018 it was announced that Lifetime was developing a new series called Live PD Presents: Women on Patrol as a spin-off to A&E's Live PD. The series received a twenty-episode order and followed  female law enforcement officers from departments in Jackson, Wyoming, Wilmington, North Carolina Tempe, Arizona, and Stockton, California. It was revealed on June 4, 2018 that Lifetime would be airing the series with Escaping Polygamy in a two-hour programming block hosted by Gretchen Carlson called "Justice for Women with Gretchen Carlson." Lifetime later ordered an additional twenty episodes of the series bringing the total episode count to forty episodes. Despite having a forty episode order only thirty-four episodes aired. In August 2018 it was confirmed that the Wilmington Police Department would be filming part of the second season of the series.

Episodes

References

2018 American television series debuts
2010s American reality television series
American television spin-offs
Lifetime (TV network) original programming
Live PD
2018 American television series endings
Reality television spin-offs